The Auckland wine region is a New Zealand wine-growing area and geographical indication centred around New Zealand's largest city, Auckland.

History 

Dalmatian immigrants arriving in New Zealand in the late 19th and early 20th centuries brought with them viticultural knowledge and planted vineyards in West and North Auckland. Typically, their vineyards produced table wine and fortified wine to suit the palates of their communities.

Climate and geography 

Soils are usually either heavy clay, or volcanic-derived soils. It is the warmest of New Zealand's vine-growing areas.

Regions 

There are three sub-regions within Auckland established as geographical indications: Waiheke Island, Kumeu, and Matakana. In recent years, the hotter temperatures are allowing Auckland winemakers (for example Omaha Bay, Cooper's Creek, Heron's Flight, Matavino, and Obsidian) to experiment with Italian and Spanish grape varieties, such as Albariño, Montepulciano, Sangiovese, Dolcetto, Temperanillo, and even Nebbiolo.

Waiheke Island 

Waiheke Island, just off the east coast of Auckland in the Hauraki Gulf, has a dry and warm mesoclimate and is planted primarily in French red grape varieties: Syrah, Merlot, Cabernet Sauvignon, and Chardonnay. The Bordeaux style red wines that are produced are considered to be significantly ripe and full bodied, and some of the best in New Zealand. The island's very small area of  constrains wineries to a small boutique scale.

Kumeu 

The Geographical Indication of Kumeu is a small sub-region west of Auckland City, surrounding the towns of Huapai and Kumeu, as far west as Waimauku, and east to the southern edge of the town of Riverhead. The area is most notable for its excellent Chardonnay, with well reviewed examples especially from Kumeu River and Soljans Estate Winery. Chardonnay makes up 85% of the vineyard area in Kumeu, with Pinot Gris and Pinot Noir making up most of the remainder. Some of New Zealand's oldest wineries are in Kumeu, established in the late 1800s by Croatian settlers working the Kauri gum fields. Some of these, such as Montana Wines (now Brancott Estate), Babich, Nobilo, and Cooper's Creek are now among New Zealand's largest wineries, having extended their operations throughout the rest of New Zealand.

Matakana 

It extends from Mahurangi Harbour in the south, and as far north as Leigh, although most of the vineyards are clustered in the hills and valleys between Warkworth and Matakana. The area has a warm mesoclimate protected from prevailing winds by hills to the north and west, and a maritime influence from Omaha Bay and Kawau Bay. Matakana wineries are mostly small, family-run or "lifestyle" vineyards, with very small plots and non-commercial production volumes, usually dry-farmed on north-facing hill slopes.

Winemaking began in Matakana in the 1960s, but the oldest, current vineyards are Heron's Flight (established 1988), Providence Wines, and Ransom Wines, established in the early 1990s. Around the turn of the century, Heron's Flight replanted its mainly Bordeaux varieties with the Italian varieties Sangiovese and Dolcetto, and many of the newer wineries, have also planted Tannat and Petit Verdot alongside the usual French varieties, as well as the Italian and Spanish varieties Barbera, Nebbiolo, Albariño, Roussanne, and Montepulciano. As of the 2017 vintage, there were more than  planted in vines, and 21 commercial grape growing/winery operations within the Matakana GI.

Viticulture and winemaking 

Overall, the region's most planted variety is Chardonnay, which accounts for nearly a quarter of the vineyard area. Auckland wineries produce some of New Zealand's finest Chardonnay white wines. British wine writer Jancis Robinson and others frequently rank Kumeu River Chardonnay with the finest white Burgundy wines such as Montrachet. The next-most planted varieties are Syrah and Pinot Gris, and the Merlot, Cabernet Franc, Cabernet Sauvignon and Malbec that produce Auckland's well regarded Bordeaux-style wines.

References

Bibliography

External links 

Wine regions of New Zealand
New Zealand wine
Geography of Auckland
Economy of Auckland